Allen is a city in Lyon County, Kansas, United States.  As of the 2020 census, the population of the city was 160.

History
Allen was founded in 1854. It was incorporated as a city in 1909.

Allen was a station on the Missouri Pacific Railroad.

Geography
Allen is located at  (38.656472, -96.170511).

Climate
The climate in this area is characterized by hot, humid summers and generally mild to cool winters.  According to the Köppen Climate Classification system, Allen has a humid subtropical climate, abbreviated "Cfa" on climate maps.

Demographics

Allen is part of the Emporia Micropolitan Statistical Area.

2010 census
As of the census of 2010, there were 177 people, 77 households, and 46 families residing in the city. The racial makeup of the city was 96.0% White, 2.3% from other races, and 1.7% from two or more races. Hispanic or Latino of any race were 4.0% of the population.

There were 77 households, of which 28.6% had children under the age of 18 living with them, 49.4% were married couples living together, 7.8% had a female householder with no husband present, 2.6% had a male householder with no wife present, and 40.3% were non-families. 36.4% of all households were made up of individuals, and 13% had someone living alone who was 65 years of age or older. The average household size was 2.30 and the average family size was 3.07.

The median age in the city was 42.4 years. 26% of residents were under the age of 18; 3.8% were between the ages of 18 and 24; 23.7% were from 25 to 44; 28.7% were from 45 to 64; and 17.5% were 65 years of age or older. The gender makeup of the city was 53.1% male and 46.9% female.

2000 census
As of the census of 2000, there were 211 people, 83 households, and 62 families residing in the city. The racial makeup of the city was 98.10% White, 0.47% African American and 1.42% Native American. Hispanic or Latino of any race were 0.95% of the population.

There were 83 households, out of which 39.8% had children under the age of 18 living with them, 59.0% were married couples living together, 12.0% had a female householder with no husband present, and 25.3% were non-families. 24.1% of all households were made up of individuals, and 14.5% had someone living alone who was 65 years of age or older. The average household size was 2.54 and the average family size was 3.00.

In the city, the population was spread out, with 29.9% under the age of 18, 6.6% from 18 to 24, 28.4% from 25 to 44, 20.9% from 45 to 64, and 14.2% who were 65 years of age or older. The median age was 36 years. For every 100 females, there were 113.1 males. For every 100 females age 18 and over, there were 102.7 males.

The median income for a household in the city was $32,500, and the median income for a family was $39,792. Males had a median income of $30,000 versus $24,500 for females. The per capita income for the city was $15,855. About 10.2% of families and 8.0% of the population were below the poverty line, including 18.9% of those under the age of eighteen and none of those 65 or over.

Education
The community is served by North Lyon County USD 251 public school district, and home to Northern Heights High School.  The Northern Heights High School mascot is Northern Heights Wildcats.

Transportation
U.S. Route 56 passes along the north edge of Allen.

References

Further reading

External links
 Allen - Directory of Public Officials
 Allen city map, KDOT

Cities in Kansas
Cities in Lyon County, Kansas
Emporia, Kansas micropolitan area
1854 establishments in Kansas Territory